Karyn Usher is an American television producer and writer.

She has produced twenty-four episodes for the television series Prison Break, and additionally written twelve episodes. She has also written single episodes from the series One Tree Hill, North Shore and The Lyon's Den. In 2010, he signed a production deal with 20th Century Fox Television.

Prison Break (14 episodes)
1.07 - Riots, Drills, and the Devil (written)
1.12 - Odd Man Out (written)
1.17 - J-Cat (written)
1.18 - Bluff (co-written with Nick Santora)
2.05 - Map 1213 (written)
2.10 - Rendezvous (written)
2.12 - Disconnect (co-written with Nick Santora)
2.15 - The Message (co-written with Zack Estrin)
2.17 - Bad Blood (co-written with Paul Scheuring)
2.19 - Sweet Caroline (written)
3.05 - Interference (written)
3.09 - Boxed In (written)
4.04 - Eagles & Angels (written)
4.10 - The Legend (written)

References

External links
 

American television producers
American women television producers
American television writers
Living people
American women television writers
Place of birth missing (living people)
Year of birth missing (living people)
21st-century American women